Billy Boy (previously Juvenile) is a 2017 American drama film directed by Bradley Buecker and written by Blake Jenner. The film stars Jenner, Melissa Benoist, Greg Germann, Melissa Bolona, Jim Beaver, Grant Harvey, and Aramis Knight. Billy Boy premiered at the Fantastic Fest on September 23, 2017, before a simultaneous release by Gravitas Ventures on June 15, 2018.

Plot
Troublemaker Billy Forsetti falls for the beautiful Jennifer. But when a carjacking takes a turn for the worse, Billy finds himself in for trouble.

Cast
 Blake Jenner as Billy Forsetti
 Melissa Benoist as Jennifer
 Jim Beaver as Crabtree
 Greg Germann as Mr. Langdon
 Andre Royo as Mr. Adams
 Brenda Bakke as Margarette
 Aramis Knight as Carlos
 Melissa Bolona as Jules
 Nick Eversman as Greg Basualdo
 Blaine Saunders as Young Girl
 Grant Harvey as Mikey Valentino
 Cole Bernstein as Miranda
 Derek Mio as Jimmy
 Brad Hunt as Frank
 Jack Foley as Boy

Release
The film premiered at Fantastic Fest on September 23, 2017. It later was shown at the San Diego International Film Festival on October 6, 2017 and the Miami International Film Festival on March 14, 2018. It was scheduled to be released on June 15, 2018.

The film was originally scheduled to premiere on March 4, 2017 at the 2017 Miami International Film Festival under its original title Billy Boy, but was cancelled later on, amid speculation that this was linked to the star Melissa Benoist having recently filed for divorce from her co-star and writer Blake Jenner.

Reception
Amelia Emberwing from "Birth Movies Death" gave the film a bad review. She praised its premise, but criticized its development. Emberwing also praised the actor's performances, but wrote: "At the end of the day, Juvenile is a bad film filled with some exceptional performances. Each actor shines in their role, and adds to the tone of the movie. Those performances aren’t enough to salvage questionable editing choices and an empty story direction, but do manage to make a bit more of a palatable watch."

References

External links
 

2017 films
2017 drama films
2010s English-language films
American drama films
2010s American films